Suicide peak might refer to:

Suicide Rock, in Southern California
North Suicide Peak, in Alaska, United States
South Suicide Peak, in Alaska, United States